Inner circle may refer to:

Society
Friendship networks, where "inner circle" may describe the closest of friends
Esoteric teaching, knowledge that is confined to an inner group
Inner–outer directions, a method of labeling direction of travel for geographic loops
Inner Circle (addiction recovery), inner-most circle of three circles in addiction recovery diagram
Inner circle (psychoanalysis) or Freud's inner circle
 Cabal, a group of people united in some close design together, usually to promote their private views or interests
 One of Kachru's Three Circles of English; see World Englishes

Organizations
Inner Circle of Advocates, trial lawyer group
Inner Circle (parody group), a New York parody group
 The Inner Circle (dating site), an invitation-only online dating service for affluent, professional singles

Transport
Birmingham Inner Circle, a circular bus route following Birmingham's inner ring road in the West Midlands County of England 
Inner Circle (London Underground), an early name for the central circuit route of the London Underground that is now known as the Circle Line
Inner Circle railway line, Melbourne, a former railway line in Melbourne, Australia

Literature 
 The Inner Circle (Boyle novel), a 2004 novel by T. C. Boyle about Alfred Kinsey
 The Inner Circle (Meltzer novel), a 2011 novel by Brad Meltzer

Film and television
 The Inner Circle (1912 film), a film directed by D. W. Griffith
 The Inner Circle (1946 film), an American film directed by Philip Ford
 The Inner Circle (1991 film), a film about KGB officer Ivan Sanchin
"The Inner Circle" (The Office), a 2011 episode of The Office

Music 
 Inner Circle (band), a Jamaican reggae group
 The Inner Circle (album), a 2004 album by Evergrey
 The Black Metal Inner Circle from the early Norwegian black metal scene

Other
 Inner Circle (board game), a Milton Bradley board game from 1981
 Inner Circle Rum, a brand of rum made and sold in Australia
 Inner Circle, a fictional terrorist group in Call of Duty: Modern Warfare 3
 The Inner Circle (professional wrestling), professional wrestling stable in All Elite Wrestling led by Chris Jericho